The Governor of Hofburg Palace is in charge of the Hofburg palace in Vienna. The office is under auspices of the Burghauptmannschaft.

The office exists since the Middle Ages and for most of the period and into the Baroque era the title was Burggrave. Starting in 1750 under the reign of Empress Maria Theresa the office became known as Burginspektor. It was changed again in 1850 under the reign of Emperor Franz Joseph I to Burghauptmann, a title which also appeared however in the Middle Ages.

Originally the office was entrusted to guard the castle and defend it in case of attack. The holder of the office and the administration was located in the castle as well. Apart from the administration and logistics of the palace, it also included the movable objects such as furniture.

List of governors 
 Burggrave Michael von Maidenau around 1434
 Burghauptmann Niklas Barczal von Döbre 1443-1447
 Burghauptmann Graf Johann von Schaunberg 1447-?
 Burggrave Cristoff von Hohenveld 1492-1496
 Vicedominus-Burggrave Siegmund Schnaidpeck 1497-1501
 Vicedominus-Burggrave Hans Mader 1501-1503
 Vicedominus-Burggrave Lorenz Saurer 1503-1525
 Einnehmergeneral and Vicedominus Georg Khiembseer 1525-1526
 Stadthauptmann of Vienna Hans von Greysenegg 1526-1530
 Stadthauptmann Hanns Apfaltrer 1530-1538
 Burgvogt Joachim von Thalheim 1538-1547 together with Administrator of Burggrave Christo Aichstetter 1541-1552
Burggrave Leopold Heyperger 1547-1560
 Burggrave Veit Schärdinger 1560-1572
 Burggrave Richard Perger 1572-1572
 Burggrave Hanns Radlhofer 1573-1582
 Burggrave Jacob von Haag 1582-1592
 Provisional Burggrave Hans Wilhelm Rechperger 1592-1594
 Burggrave Hans Painsodt 1594-1598
 Burg-Countess Marie Painsodt 1598-1601
 Burggrave  Lucas Eisenhardt 1601-1616 together with Administrator of Burggrave Hanns Kreussig 1614-1617
 Burggrave Erasmus de Sayue 1617-1632
 Burggrave Oswald von Hüttendorf 1632-1642
 Burggrave Andreas de Harena 1643-1661
 Burggrave Johann Ostermeyer 1661-1678
 Burggrave Peter Parent de Clerfort 1679-1693
 Administrator of Burggrave Conrad Engel 1691-1694
 Burggrave Siegmund Fürnpfeil von Pfeilheim 1694-1699
 Burggrave Conrad Engel von Engelburg 1699-1709
 Burggrave Nicolas Collard 1709-1725
 Burggrave Johann Anton von Schiessl 1725-1756
 Burginspektor Andreas Pögle 1750-1767
 Burggrave Anton von Salazar 1756-1792
 Burginspektor Andreas Pögle 1750-1767
 Burginspektor Ignaz Brändl 1767-1795
 Burginspektor Josef Fauken 1795-1808
 Burginspektor Peter Roth 1808-1820
 Burginspektor Johann Seri 1820-1835
 Burginspektor Ludwig Wagner 1835-1850
 Burghauptmann Ludwig Montoyer 1850-1870
 Burghauptmann Ferdinand Kirschner 1870-1895
 Burghauptmann Heinrich Lisseck 1895-1902
 Burghauptmann Anton Niklas 1902-1909
 Burghauptmann Anton Hauffe 1909-1915
 Burghauptmann Rudolf Mammer 1916-1922
 Burgbauarchitekt Ludwig Baumann 1922-1924
 Burghauptmann Emanuel Karajan 1924-1933
 Burghauptmann Rudolf Koppensteiner 1934
 Alois Buresch 1935
 Karl Walbinger 1936-1944
 Rudolf Koppensteiner 1941-1945
 Burghauptmann Paul Neumann 1945-1969
 Burghauptmann Otto Sehorz 1969-1973
 Burghauptmann Karl Bayer 1973-1986
 Burghauptmann Richard Kastner 1987-1993
 Burghauptmann Hans Müller 1994-1995
 Burghauptmann Wolfgang Beer 1995-2010
 Burghauptmann Reinhold Sahl 2010-

See also 
 Constables and Governors of Windsor Castle

References

External links 
 Burghauptmannschaft Austria (official homepage)

Burgraves
Hofburg